For the Good of Others is a 2010 Spanish drama film directed by Oskar Santos.

Cast

Production 
The film is a Telecinco Cinema, MOD Producciones and Himenóptero production.

See also 
 List of Spanish films of 2010

References

External links 

2010 drama films
2010 films
Spanish drama films
Telecinco Cinema films
MOD Producciones films
2010s Spanish films
2010s Spanish-language films